Méridien is a serif typeface designed by Adrian Frutiger and released by Deberny & Peignot in 1957 for its phototypesetting system.

Intended as a typeface suitable for text use, Méridien takes inspiration from 'Latin' or wedge-serif typefaces, with their sharp, exaggerated serifs, but in a more restrained style intended to be suitable for body text, with a wide spacing. It is one of several typefaces designed by Frutiger in this genre; his Apollo for Monotype is quite similar.

Méridien was later published by Linotype, who released a digitisation in collaboration with Adobe. An updated digitisation was released under the name of "Frutiger Serif" with additional weights and condensed styles.

References

Typefaces designed by Adrian Frutiger
Serif typefaces
Linotype typefaces